Isoa Tuinaceva Logavatu (born 1925 at Nadi, Fiji; died 1991 in Fiji) was a Fijian cricketer.

Logavatu made his first-class debut for Fiji in 1948 against Auckland during Fiji's 1947/48 tour of New Zealand. During the tour he played five first-class matches, with his final first-class match coming against Auckland.

In his 5 first-class matches for Fiji he scored 73 runs at a batting average of 12.16, with a high score of 48. With the ball he took 16 wickets at a bowling average of 30.00, with best figures of 4/46. Logavatu took 3 catches in the field.

Logavatu also represented Fiji in 26 non first-class matches from 1948 to 1962, with his final match for Fiji coming against Taranaki during their 1961/62 tour of New Zealand.

Logavatu died in Fiji in 1991.

External links
Isoa Logavatu at Cricinfo
Isoa Logavatu at CricketArchive

1925 births
1991 deaths
Fijian cricketers
Sportspeople from Nadi
I-Taukei Fijian people